"Liberating Soul" is Tesla Boy's third single from their studio album, Modern Thrills. It was released on 18 October 2010.

Track listing

2010 singles
Tesla Boy songs
2010 songs